Kondoaceae is a family of fungi in the order Agaricostilbales. The family contains two genera. Most species are known only from their yeast states. Hyphal teleomorphs produced in culture have auricularioid (laterally septate) basidia.

References

External links

Basidiomycota families
Agaricostilbales
Taxa named by Franz Oberwinkler
Taxa described in 2006